Jiménez is a district of the Pococí canton, in the Limón province of Costa Rica.

History 
Jiménez was created on 19 September 1911 by Ley 12.

Geography 
Jiménez has an area of  km² and an elevation of  metres.

It presents a mountainous landscape in the south and flat to the north, with an average altitude of 223 meters on the level of the sea.

It is located in the central Caribbean region and borders the districts of Roxana to the north, Guápiles to the southwest, Canton of Guácimo to the southeast.

Its head, the town of Jiménez, is located 5.2 km (11 minutes) to the east of Guápiles and 71.5 km (1 hours 36 minutes) northeast of San José the capital of the nation.

Demographics 

For the 2011 census, Jiménez had a population of  inhabitants.

Settlements
The population centers that make up the district are:
Neighborhoods (Barrios): Granja, Molino, Numancia, Santa Clara
Villages (Poblados): Anita Grande, Calle Diez, Calle Emilia, Calle Seis, Calle Uno, Floritas, Parasal, San Luis, San Martín, San Valentín, Suerre

Transportation

Road transportation 
The district is covered by the following road routes:
 National Route 32
 National Route 810

Economy 
Jiménez, its head town, has health and education services.

In terms of trade, the sale of groceries and various accessories stands out.

References

External links
Instituto Nacional de Estadísticas y Censos
Municipalidad de Pococí

Districts of Limón Province
Populated places in Limón Province